Tavernelle is a small village in the hills of the Lunigiana, at 450 metres (1,480 ft) above sea level. It has a medieval centre with a restaurant, bar and campsite.

The village of Tavernelle belongs to the municipality of Licciana Nardi, in the province of Massa-Carrara in Tuscany, Italy.

Tavernelle has 154 inhabitants (2008).

Licciana Nardi
Frazioni of the Province of Massa-Carrara